This is a list of LGBT characters in modern written fiction. The historical concept and definition of sexual orientation varies and has changed greatly over time; for example, the word "gay" was not used to describe sexual orientation until the mid 20th century. A number of different classification schemes have been used to describe sexual orientation since the mid-19th century, and scholars have often defined the term 'sexual orientation' in divergent ways. Indeed, several studies have found that much of the research about sexual orientation has failed to define the term at all, making it difficult to reconcile the results of different studies. However, most definitions include a psychological component (such as the direction of an individual's erotic desire) and/or a behavioral component (which focuses on the sex of the individual's sexual partner/s). Some prefer to simply follow an individual's self-definition or identity. See homosexuality and bisexuality for criteria that have traditionally denoted lesbian, gay and bisexual (LGB) people.

Items listed here must have verifiable third-party sources commenting on the sexuality of the character(s) in question, and additional explanation may be necessary. Additionally, only notable/significant characters from a given work (which may have multiple LGBT characters) need to be listed here.

The names are organized alphabetically by surname (i.e. last name), or by single name if the character does not have a surname. If more than two characters are in one entry, the last name of the first character is used.

19th century

20th century

21st century

See also

 Gay literature
 Lesbian fiction
 Transgender publications

Notes

References

Lists of literary characters
Modern written fiction